Nyctegretis leonina is a species of snout moth in the genus Nyctegretis. It was described by George Hampson in 1930, and it is known from South Africa, Sierra Leone and Zimbabwe.

References

Moths described in 1930
Phycitini